Hasleen Kaur is an Indian model. She was the first runner up at the Pantaloons Femina Miss India and represented India at the Miss Earth 2011 beauty pageant on 3 December 2011. She has appeared in several advertisements before making her Bollywood debut in the 2014 movie Karle Pyaar Karle.

Early life and education
Hasleen was raised in Delhi. She did her graduation in English from Jesus and Mary College, and later received a degree in mass communication from Indian Institute of Mass Communication, New Delhi.

Modelling 
Hasleen Kaur has modeled for several advertisements. She also worked as an Elite Model and appeared in Elite Fashion Calendar in 2011.

Femina Miss India 
She participated in 2011 Pantaloons Femina Miss India pageant and won the Femina Miss India Earth 2011, where Kanishtha Dhankar was crowned the Femina Miss India World. Femina Miss India Earth 2010 and reigning Miss Earth 2010, Nicole Faria, crowned her at the end of the event.

Miss Earth 2011 
She competed at the Miss Earth 2011 pageant which was held on 3 December in Manila, Philippines, but was unplaced.

Career
Hasleen's been a fashion model.

Filmography

References

External links
 
 

1989 births
Living people
Female models from West Bengal
Femina Miss India winners
Indian environmentalists
Punjabi people
People from Jalpaiguri district
Activists from West Bengal
Indian women environmentalists
21st-century Indian women
21st-century Indian people
Miss Earth 2011 contestants
Miss Earth India delegates
Delhi University alumni